Asherton Independent School District was a public school district based in the community of Asherton, Texas (USA).

The community was along the Mexico–United States border, and was southwest of San Antonio.

The district existed until 1999, when it was ordered consolidated with Carrizo Springs schools by the Texas Education Agency (TEA) to form the Carrizo Springs Consolidated Independent School District.  The TEA determined that the Asherton ISD had not followed proper procedure in assessing school property taxes, the basis for its closure. TEA officials stated that "financial instability/insolvency" was the reason behind the district's dissolution.

The Carrizo Springs district moved all students in grades 7-12 into its existing junior high and high schools, but left the Asherton school open to serve grades PreK-6.

District enrollment (1988-1999)

1988-89 - 419 students
1989-90 - 414 students
1990-91 - 474 students
1991-92 - 444 students
1992-93 - 436 students
1993-94 - 430 students
1994-95 - 401 students
1995-96 - 388 students
1996-97 - 392 students
1997-98 - 365 students
1998-99 - 364 students

The ethnic composition of Asherton ISD in its final year of operation (1998–99) was 98% Hispanic, 1% White, and 1% African American. Of the 364 students, 330 (90.7%) were considered economically disadvantaged.

Student performance
Asherton ISD's performance on the Texas Assessment of Academic Skills (TAAS), a state standardized test used from 1991 to 2003, generally met state standards. The elementary and high school campuses consistently received ratings of "Acceptable" based on the number of students passing each section of the TAAS test. The district received a separate rating of "Academically Unacceptable: Special Accreditation Investigation (SAI)" in its final four years of operation. Unlike an "Academically Unacceptable" rating, that was designated for districts with low student test performance, "Academically Unacceptable: SAI" ratings were based on problems in governance, finances, testing practice, compliance with federal regulation, and/or administrative management.

References

Former school districts in Texas
School districts in Dimmit County, Texas
School districts disestablished in 1999
1999 disestablishments in Texas